Crassostrea ingens is a species of fossil oyster, a marine bivalve mollusk in the family Ostreidae, the oyster. This species lived during the Pliocene. Fossils have been found in New Zealand shallow-water limestone and shellbeds. Locations include the Wairarapa, Whanganui basin, Gisborne district, North Canterbury, and Hawke's Bay (especially in the Te Aute limestone).

Description
Crassostrea ingens is a giant fossil oyster. This shell is biconvex. Most specimens curve slightly to the left. The adductor scar area in most Pliocene specimens retains a purplish red colour. Beu and Raine (2009) note that: "This is the sole giant oyster in New Zealand Late Miocene–Pliocene rocks, and there has never been any confusion over the identity of C. ingens."

References 

Crassostrea
Bivalves of New Zealand
Extinct animals of New Zealand
Molluscs described in 1864